Wolf is an unincorporated community in Seminole County, Oklahoma, United States.  Wolf is west-southwest of Wewoka, Oklahoma, the county seat, and less than five miles south of Bowlegs, Oklahoma.  It is located east of the concurrent US-377/OK-99, as well as east of Old State Highway 99, on EW1330 Rd.  It had a post office from February 25, 1903 to September 14, 1907.

Notable person
 Lyle Boren - worked as a school teacher in Wolf prior to his election to the United States Congress in 1936

References

Unincorporated communities in Seminole County, Oklahoma
Unincorporated communities in Oklahoma